Sneham Kosam is a 1999 Indian Telugu-language drama film produced by A. M. Ratnam under the Sri Surya Movies banner. Directed by K. S. Ravikumar, the film stars Chiranjeevi in a dual role of father and son, along with Meena while VijayaKumar and Prakash Raj play supporting roles. Released on 1 January 1999, the film is a remake of Ravikumar's own Tamil film Natpukkaga (1998).

Plot
Chinnayya (Chiranjeevi) works for a rich man Vijayakumar in a village. Despite being a labourer, Chinnayya has great respect and affection towards Vijayakumar. Vijayakumar too takes care of Chinnayya with great affection and looks after him as his own son. Vijayakumar hates his first daughter Gowri (Sitara) and her husband Peddabbayi (Prakash Raj). Prabhavathy (Meena) is Vijayakumar's younger daughter and she arrives to the village after completing her education from the US. Prabhavathy loves Chinnayya, but Chinnayya does not reciprocate, thinking this would be a betrayal of Vijayakumar's trust on him. Later Chinnayya too understands Prabhavathy's true love and accepts it.

One day, suddenly Prabhavathy accuses that Chinnayya tried to rape her. This angers Vijayakumar and he beats and sends Chinnayya out of his home. At this time, Simhadri (also Chiranjeevi), Chinnayya's father is released from jail and comes to meet Vijayakumar. Simhadri also worked under Vijayakumar before and has won Vijayakumar's trust so much. But Prabhavathy gets angry on seeing Simhadri and asks him to leave the house because Simhadri has been sent to jail for murdering Vijayakumar's wife Lakshmi (Sujatha) a few years back. Prabhavathy also reveals the truth that she staged a drama to send Chinnayya away from her father. Vijayakumar gets shocked knowing the truth and feels bad that he has misunderstood Chinnayya, believing his daughter's false words.

Chinnayya also hates his father Simhadri from childhood days as he was accused of killing Lakshmi. The story moves to a flashback. Simhadri was a loyal servant in Vijayakumar's home. Peddabbayi is the younger brother of Lakshmi and his wedding is arranged with Gowri. On the day of marriage, Lakshmi gets to know about Peddabbayi's plans to rob Vijayakumar's properties and decides to cancel the wedding. But Peddabbayi injures Lakshmi badly and hides her in a room and the marriage is done. But Simhadri finds Lakshmi and gets to know all the truth about Peddabbayi. Before he could go and stop the marriage, it is already done and so he does not want Peddabbayi to go to jail as that would impact Gowri's life. Lakshmi is dead and Simhadri accepts that he has murdered Lakshmi for money and gets arrested by police. This makes Gowri and Prabhavathy to hate him and his family.

But Vijayakumar does not believe this and goes to jail to meet Simhadri and asks the truth. Simhadri tells all the truth to Vijayakumar and gets a promise that Vijayakumar should not reveal this truth to anyone else as Gowri will be alone then. Vijayakumar agrees but sends Peddabbayi out of his home. Gowri also leaves his home without knowing the truth and understanding her father. The story comes to the present and a wedding is planned between Prabhavathy and Peddabbayi's younger brother Ranjith, the third of the siblings. On the day of marriage, Vijayakumar tells this truth to everyone and Peddabbayi tries to kill Gowri. But Simhadri comes in between and gets stabbed and dies.  Peddabbayi gets killed by Ranjith after knowing the truth that his sister Lakshmi is killed by none other than Peddabbayi. Meanwhile, Vijayakumar cries in front of Simhadri's dead body and he also dies along with him. The movie ends with Chinnayya and Prabhavathy getting married.

Cast
 Chiranjeevi in dual role as Simhadri and Chinnayya
 Meena as Prabhavathi
 Sithara as Gowri
 Vijayakumar as Peddayya, Gowri's and Prabhavathi's father
 Prakash Raj as Peddabbayi
 Nirmalamma as Simhadri's Mother
 Sujatha as Lakshmi
 Brahmanandam
 Kota Srinivasa Rao
 Babu Mohan
 Mallikarjuna Rao
 M. S. Narayana as Annavaram
 K. S. Ravikumar

Production
In December 1997, Rajinikanth announced that his next film would be directed by K. S. Ravikumar, who had made the successful 1995 film Muthu with the actor. Filming was initially slated to begin in April 1998, but the FEFSI strike delayed proceedings and Ravikumar was only able to complete his previous film Natpukkaga by June 1998. A. M. Rathnam, who produced Natpukkaga requested Ravikumar to remake the film in Telugu with Chiranjeevi in the lead. Though initially reluctant, he accepted to quickly remake the film in Telugu as Sneham Kosam. The film's shooting was completed in 45 days.

Soundtrack

The music and background score was composed by S. A. Rajkumar. Music was released by Aditya Music Company. Rajkumar later remade "Gundello" as "Megham Udaithu" for Tamil film Maayi.

Release 
The film was scheduled to release in November 1998 but was delayed.

Reception
Rakesh P. of The Deccan Herald wrote that "On the whole a family entertainer".

Awards

|-
| 1999
| Chiranjeevi
| Filmfare Award for Best Telugu Actor
| 
|}

Box-office
The film was a huge grosser and one of the biggest hit in 1999. The film ran for 50 days in 89 centres and 100 days in 52 centres. There was also a Hindi dubbed version of the Telugu version titled Main Hoon Rakhwala.

References

External links
 

1999 films
Telugu remakes of Tamil films
Films directed by K. S. Ravikumar
Films scored by S. A. Rajkumar
1990s Telugu-language films